Volatile organic compounds (VOCs) are organic compounds that have a high vapor pressure at room temperature. High vapor pressure correlates with a low boiling point, which relates to the number of the sample's molecules in the surrounding air, a trait known as volatility.

VOCs are responsible for the odor of scents and perfumes as well as pollutants. VOCs play an important role in communication between animals and plants, e.g. attractants for pollinators, protection from predation, and even inter-plant interactions. Some VOCs are dangerous to human health or cause harm to the environment. Anthropogenic VOCs are regulated by law, especially indoors, where concentrations are the highest. Most VOCs are not acutely toxic, but may have long-term chronic health effects. Some VOCs have been used in pharmacy, others are target of administrative controls because of their recreational use.

Definitions
Diverse definitions of the term VOC are in use. Some examples are presented below.

Canada
The emphasis is placed on commonly encountered VOCs that would have an effect on air quality.

European Union
The European Union defines a VOC as "any organic compound as well as the fraction of creosote, having at 293.15 K a vapour pressure of 0,01 kPa or more, or having a corresponding volatility under the particular conditions of use;". The VOC Solvents Emissions Directive was the main policy instrument for the reduction of industrial emissions of volatile organic compounds (VOCs) in the European Union. It covers a wide range of solvent-using activities, e.g. printing, surface cleaning, vehicle coating, dry cleaning and manufacture of footwear and pharmaceutical products. The VOC Solvents Emissions Directive requires installations in which such activities are applied to comply either with the emission limit values set out in the Directive or with the requirements of the so-called reduction scheme. Article 13 of The Paints Directive, approved in 2004, amended the original VOC Solvents Emissions Directive and limits the use of organic solvents in decorative paints and varnishes and in vehicle finishing products. The Paints Directive sets out maximum VOC content limit values for paints and varnishes in certain applications. The Solvents Emissions Directive was replaced by the Industrial Emissions Directive from 2013.

China
The People's Republic of China defines a VOC as those compounds that have "originated from automobiles, industrial production and civilian use, burning of all types of fuels, storage and transportation of oils, fitment finish, coating for furniture and machines, cooking oil fume and fine particles (PM 2.5)", and similar sources. The Three-Year Action Plan for Winning the Blue Sky Defence War released by the State Council in July 2018 creates an action plan to reduce 2015 VOC emissions 10% by 2020.

India
The Central Pollution Control Board of India released the Air (Prevention and Control of Pollution) Act in 1981, amended in 1987, to address concerns about air pollution in India. While the document does not differentiate between VOCs and other air pollutants, the CPCB monitors "oxides of nitrogen (NOx), sulphur dioxide (SO2), fine particulate matter (PM10) and suspended particulate matter (SPM)".

United States

The definitions of VOCs used for control of precursors of photochemical smog used by the U.S. Environmental Protection Agency (EPA) and state agencies in the US with independent outdoor air pollution regulations include exemptions for VOCs that are determined to be non-reactive, or of low-reactivity in the smog formation process. Prominent is the VOC regulation issued by the South Coast Air Quality Management District in California and by the California Air Resources Board (CARB). However, this specific use of the term VOCs can be misleading, especially when applied to indoor air quality because many chemicals that are not regulated as outdoor air pollution can still be important for indoor air pollution.

Following a public hearing in September 1995, California's ARB uses the term "reactive organic gases" (ROG) to measure organic gases. The CARB revised the definition of "Volatile Organic Compounds" used in their consumer products regulations, based on the committee's findings.

In addition to drinking water, VOCs are regulated in pollutant discharges to surface waters (both directly and via sewage treatment plants) as hazardous waste, but not in non-industrial indoor air. The Occupational Safety and Health Administration (OSHA) regulates VOC exposure in the workplace. Volatile organic compounds that are classified as hazardous materials are regulated by the Pipeline and Hazardous Materials Safety Administration while being transported.

Biologically generated VOCs

Most VOCs in earth's atmosphere are biogenic, largely emitted by plants.

Biogenic volatile organic compounds (BVOCs) encompass VOCs emitted by plants, animals, or microorganisms, and while extremely diverse, are most commonly terpenoids, alcohols, and carbonyls (methane and carbon monoxide are generally not considered). Not counting methane, biological sources emit an estimated 760 teragrams of carbon per year in the form of VOCs. The majority of VOCs are produced by plants, the main compound being isoprene. Small amounts of VOCs are produced by animals and microbes. Many VOCs are considered secondary metabolites, which often help organisms in defense, such as plant defense against herbivory. The strong odor emitted by many plants consists of green leaf volatiles, a subset of VOCs. Although intended for nearby organisms to detect and respond to, these volatiles can be detected and communicated through wireless electronic transmission, by embedding nanosensors and infrared transmitters into the plant materials themselves.

Emissions are affected by a variety of factors, such as temperature, which determines rates of volatilization and growth, and sunlight, which determines rates of biosynthesis. Emission occurs almost exclusively from the leaves, the stomata in particular. VOCs emitted by terrestrial forests are often oxidized by hydroxyl radicals in the atmosphere; in the absence of NOx pollutants, VOC photochemistry recycles hydroxyl radicals to create a sustainable biosphere-atmosphere balance. Due to recent climate change developments, such as warming and greater UV radiation, BVOC emissions from plants are generally predicted to increase, thus upsetting the biosphere-atmosphere interaction and damaging major ecosystems. A major class of VOCs is the terpene class of compounds, such as myrcene. Providing a sense of scale, a forest 62,000 km2 in area, the size of the US state of Pennsylvania, is estimated to emit 3,400,000 kilograms of terpenes on a typical August day during the growing season.  Researchers investigating mechanisms of induction of genes producing volatile organic compounds, and the subsequent increase in volatile terpenes, has been achieved in maize using (Z)-3-hexen-1-ol and other plant hormones.

Anthropogenic sources 

Anthropogenic sources emit about 142 teragrams (1.42 × 1011 kg) of carbon per year in the form of VOCs.

The major source of man-made VOCs are: 
Fossil fuel use and production, e.g. incompletely combusted fossil fuels or unintended evaporation of fuels. The most prevalent VOC is ethane, a relatively inert compound.
Solvents used in coatings, paints, and inks. Approximately 12 billion litres of paint are produced annually. Typical solvents include aliphatic hydrocarbons, ethyl acetate, glycol ethers, and acetone. Motivated by cost, environmental concerns, and regulation, the paint and coating industries are increasingly shifting toward aqueous solvents.
Compressed aerosol products, mainly butane and propane, estimated to contribute 1.3 billion tonnes of VOC emissions per year globally.
Biofuel use, e.g., cooking oils in Asia and bioethanol in Brazil.
Biomass combustion, especially from rain forests. Although combustion principally releases carbon dioxide and water, incomplete combustion affords a variety of VOCs.

Indoor VOCs
Concentrations of VOCs in indoor air may be 2 to 5 times greater than in outdoor air, sometimes far greater. During certain activities, indoor levels of VOCs may reach 1,000 times that of the outside air. Studies have shown that emissions of individual VOC species are not that high in an indoor environment, but the total concentration of all VOCs (TVOC) indoors can be up to five times higher than that of outdoor levels. New buildings experience particularly high levels of VOC off-gassing indoors because of the abundant new materials (building materials, fittings, surface coverings and treatments such as glues, paints and sealants) exposed to the indoor air, emitting multiple VOC gases. This off-gassing has a multi-exponential decay trend that is discernible over at least two years, with the most volatile compounds decaying with a time-constant of a few days, and the least volatile compounds decaying with a time-constant of a few years. New buildings may require intensive ventilation for the first few months, or a bake-out strategy. Existing buildings may be replenished with new VOC sources, such as new furniture, consumer products, and redecoration of indoor surfaces, all of which lead to a continuous background emission of TVOCs, requiring improved ventilation.

Numerous studies show strong seasonal variations in indoors VOC emissions, with emission rates increasing in summer. This is largely due to the rate of diffusion of VOC species through materials to the surface, increasing with temperature. Most studies have shown that this leads to generally higher concentrations of TVOCs indoors in summer.

Indoor air quality measurements 
Measurement of VOCs from the indoor air is done with sorption tubes e. g. Tenax (for VOCs and SVOCs) or DNPH-cartridges (for carbonyl-compounds) or air detector. The VOCs adsorb on these materials and are afterwards desorbed either thermally (Tenax) or by elution (DNPH) and then analyzed by GC-MS/FID or HPLC. Reference gas mixtures are required for quality control of these VOC-measurements. Furthermore, VOC emitting products used indoors, e.g. building products and furniture, are investigated in emission test chambers under controlled climatic conditions. For quality control of these measurements round robin tests are carried out, therefore reproducibly emitting reference materials are ideally required. Other methods have used silcosteel canisters with constant flow inlets to collect samples over several days. These methods are not limited by the adsorbing properties of materials like Tenax.

Regulation of indoor VOC emissions 
In most countries, a separate definition of VOCs is used with regard to indoor air quality that comprises each organic chemical compound that can be measured as follows: adsorption from air on Tenax TA, thermal desorption, gas chromatographic separation over a 100% nonpolar column (dimethylpolysiloxane). VOC (volatile organic compounds) are all compounds that appear in the gas chromatogram between and including n-hexane and n-hexadecane. Compounds appearing earlier are called VVOC (very volatile organic compounds); compounds appearing later are called SVOC (semi-volatile organic compounds).

France, Germany (AgBB/DIBt), Belgium, Norway (TEK regulation), and Italy (CAM Edilizia) have enacted regulations to limit VOC emissions from commercial products. European industry has developed numerous voluntary ecolabels and rating systems, such as EMICODE, M1, Blue Angel, GuT (textile floor coverings), Nordic Swan Ecolabel, EU Ecolabel, and Indoor Air Comfort. In the United States, several standards exist; California Standard CDPH Section 01350 is the most common one. These regulations and standards changed the marketplace, leading to an increasing number of low-emitting products.

Health risks
Respiratory, allergic, or immune effects in infants or children are associated with man-made VOCs and other indoor or outdoor air pollutants.

Some VOCs, such as styrene and limonene, can react with nitrogen oxides or with ozone to produce new oxidation products and secondary aerosols, which can cause sensory irritation symptoms. VOCs contribute to the formation of tropospheric ozone and smog.

Health effects include eye, nose, and throat irritation; headaches, loss of coordination, nausea; and damage to the liver, kidney, and central nervous system. Some organics can cause cancer in animals; some are suspected or known to cause cancer in humans. Key signs or symptoms associated with exposure to VOCs include conjunctival irritation, nose and throat discomfort, headache, allergic skin reaction, dyspnea, declines in serum cholinesterase levels, nausea, vomiting, nose bleeding, fatigue, dizziness.

The ability of organic chemicals to cause health effects varies greatly from those that are highly toxic to those with no known health effects. As with other pollutants, the extent and nature of the health effect will depend on many factors including level of exposure and length of time exposed. Eye and respiratory tract irritation, headaches, dizziness, visual disorders, and memory impairment are among the immediate symptoms that some people have experienced soon after exposure to some organics. At present, not much is known about what health effects occur from the levels of organics usually found in homes.

Ingestion 
While null in comparison to the concentrations found in indoor air, benzene, toluene, and methyl tert-butyl ether (MTBE) were found in samples of human milk and increase the concentrations of VOCs that we are exposed to throughout the day. A study notes the difference between VOCs in alveolar breath and inspired air suggesting that VOCs are ingested, metabolized, and excreted via the extra-pulmonary pathway. VOCs are also ingested by drinking water in varying concentrations. Some VOC concentrations were over the EPA’s National Primary Drinking Water Regulations and China’s National Drinking Water Standards set by the Ministry of Ecology and Environment.

Dermal absorption 
The presence of VOCs in the air and in groundwater has prompted more studies. Several studies have been performed to measure the effects of dermal absorption of specific VOCs. Dermal exposure to VOCs like formaldehyde and toluene downregulate antimicrobial peptides on the skin like cathelicidin LL-37, human β-defensin 2 and 3. Xylene and formaldehyde worsen allergic inflammation in animal models. Toluene also increases the dysregulation of filaggrin: a key protein in dermal regulation. this was confirmed by immunofluorescence to confirm protein loss and western blotting to confirm mRNA loss. These experiments were done on human skin samples. Toluene exposure also decreased the water in the trans-epidermal layer allowing for vulnerability in the skin’s layers.

Limit values for VOC emissions

Limit values for VOC emissions into indoor air are published by AgBB, AFSSET, California Department of Public Health, and others. These regulations have prompted several companies in the paint and adhesive industries to adapt with VOC level reductions their products. VOC labels and certification programs may not properly assess all of the VOCs emitted from the product, including some chemical compounds that may be relevant for indoor air quality. Each ounce of colorant added to tint paint may contain between 5 and 20 grams of VOCs. A dark color, however, could require 5–15 ounces of colorant, adding up to 300 or more grams of VOCs per gallon of paint.

VOCs in healthcare settings 
VOCs are also found in hospital and health care environments. In these settings, these chemicals are widely used for cleaning, disinfection, and hygiene of the different areas. Thus, health professionals such as nurses, doctors, sanitation staff, etc., may present with adverse health effects such as asthma; however, further evaluation is required to determine the exact levels and determinants that influence the exposure to these compounds.

Studies have shown that the concentration levels of different VOCs such as halogenated and aromatic hydrocarbons differ substantially between areas of the same hospital. However, one of these studies reported that ethanol, isopropanol, ether, and acetone were the main compounds in the interior of the site. Following the same line, in a study conducted in the United States, it was established that nursing assistants are the most exposed to compounds such as ethanol, while medical equipment preparers are most exposed to 2-propanol.

In relation to exposure to VOCs by cleaning and hygiene personnel, a study conducted in 4 hospitals in the United States established that sterilization and disinfection workers are linked to exposures to d-limonene and 2-propanol, while those responsible for cleaning with chlorine-containing products are more likely to have higher levels of exposure to α-pinene and chloroform. Those who perform floor and other surface cleaning tasks (e.g., floor waxing) and who use quaternary ammonium, alcohol, and chlorine-based products are associated with a higher VOC exposure than the two previous groups, that is, they are particularly linked to exposure to acetone, chloroform, α-pinene, 2-propanol or d-limonene.

Other healthcare environments such as nursing and age care homes have been rarely a subject of study, even though the elderly and vulnerable populations may spend considerable time in these indoor settings where they might be exposed to VOCs, derived from the common use of cleaning agents, sprays and fresheners. In a study conducted in France, a team of researchers developed an online questionnaire for different social and age care facilities, asking about cleaning practices, products used, and the frequency of these activities. As a result, more than 200 chemicals were identified, of which 41 are known to have adverse health effects, 37 of them being VOCs. The health effects include skin sensitization, reproductive and organ-specific toxicity, carcinogenicity, mutagenicity, and endocrine-disrupting properties. Furthermore, in another study carried out in the same European country, it was found that there is a significant association between breathlessness in the elderly population and elevated exposure to VOCs such as toluene and o-xylene, unlike the remainder of the population.

Analytical methods

Sampling
Obtaining samples for analysis is challenging.  VOCs, even when at dangerous levels, are dilute, so preconcentration is typically required.  Many components of the atmosphere are mutually incompatible, e.g. ozone and organic compounds, peroxyacyl nitrates and many organic compounds.  Furthermore, collection of VOCs by condensation in cold traps also accumulates a large amount of water, which generally must be removed selectively, depending on the analytical techniques to be employed. 
Solid-phase microextraction (SPME) techniques are used to collect VOCs at low concentrations for analysis. As applied to breath analysis, the following modalities are employed for sampling: gas sampling bags, syringes, evacuated steel and glass containers.

Principle and measurement methods
In the U.S., standard methods have been established by the National Institute for Occupational Safety and Health (NIOSH) and another by U.S. OSHA. Each method uses a single component solvent; butanol and hexane cannot be sampled, however, on the same sample matrix using the NIOSH or OSHA method.

VOCs are quantified and identified by two broad techniques. The major technique is gas chromatography (GC). GC instruments allow the separation of gaseous components.  When coupled to a flame ionization detector (FID) GCs can detect hydrocarbons at the parts per trillion levels.  Using electron capture detectors, GCs are also effective for organohalide such as chlorocarbons.

The second major technique associated with VOC analysis is mass spectrometry, which is usually coupled with GC, giving the hyphenated technique of GC-MS.

Direct injection mass spectrometry techniques are frequently utilized for the rapid detection and accurate quantification of VOCs. PTR-MS is among the methods that have been used most extensively for the on-line analysis of biogenic and anthropogenic VOCs. PTR-MS instruments based on time-of-flight mass spectrometry have been reported to reach detection limits of 20 pptv after 100 ms and 750 ppqv after 1 min. measurement (signal integration) time. The mass resolution of these devices is between 7000 and 10,500 m/Δm, thus it is possible to separate most common isobaric VOCs and quantify them independently.

Chemical fingerprinting and breath analysis
The exhaled human breath contains a few thousand volatile organic compounds and is used in breath biopsy to serve as a VOC biomarker to test for diseases, such as lung cancer. One study has shown that "volatile organic compounds ... are mainly blood borne and therefore enable monitoring of different processes in the body." And it appears that VOC compounds in the body "may be either produced by metabolic processes or inhaled/absorbed from exogenous sources" such as environmental tobacco smoke. Chemical fingerprinting and breath analysis of volatile organic compounds has also been demonstrated with chemical sensor arrays, which utilize pattern recognition for detection of component volatile organics in complex mixtures such as breath gas.

Metrology for VOC measurements
To achieve comparability of VOC measurements, reference standards traceable to SI-units are required. For a number of VOCs gaseous reference standards are available from specialty gas suppliers or national metrology institutes, either in the form of cylinders or dynamic generation methods. However, for many VOCs, such as oxygenated VOCs, monoterpenes, or formaldehyde, no standards are available at the appropriate amount of fraction due to the chemical reactivity or adsorption of these molecules. Currently, several national metrology institutes are working on the lacking standard gas mixtures at trace level concentration, minimising adsorption processes, and improving the zero gas. The final scopes are for the traceability and the long-term stability of the standard gases to be in accordance with the data quality objectives (DQO, maximum uncertainty of 20% in this case) required by the WMO/GAW program.

See also
 Aroma compound
 Criteria air contaminants
 Fugitive emissions
 Non-methane volatile organic compound
 Organic compound
 VOC contamination of groundwater
 Volatile Organic Compounds Protocol

References

External links
 
 Volatile Organic Compounds (VOCs) web site of the Chemicals Control Branch of Environment Canada 
 EPA New England: Ground-level Ozone (Smog) Information
 VOC emissions and calculations
 Examples of product labels with low VOC emission criteria
 KEY-VOCS: Metrology for VOC indicators in air pollution and climate change, a European Metrology Research Project.
 VOCs in Paints

Building biology
Organic compounds
Pollutants
Smog
Flavors
Perfumes
Pollution
 
Occupational safety and health